Dave Schatz (born November 28, 1963) is an American businessman, Republican former member of the Missouri Senate, and former state representative. He was first elected in 2014 with 73% of the vote over Democrat Lloyd Klinedinst. He served as the President Pro Tempore of the Missouri Senate between 2019 and 2023.

Personal life
Schatz and his wife, Chara, have 5 children; David, Daniel, Devon, Dana, and Dailee. They reside in Sullivan, Missouri and attend Temple Baptist Church.

Electoral history

State Representative

State Senate

References

External links

 
 Campaign website
 Senate website
 House website

1963 births
21st-century American politicians
Candidates in the 2022 United States Senate elections
Living people
Republican Party members of the Missouri House of Representatives
Republican Party Missouri state senators
People from Sullivan, Missouri
School board members in Missouri